Lobolda was a town of ancient Caria, inhabited during the Hellenistic period. Its townspeople appear often in inscriptions recovered in nearby Stratonicea.
 
Its site is located near Gürbet köy, Asiatic Turkey.

References

Populated places in ancient Caria
Former populated places in Turkey